Dhanaji Jadhav (1650–1708) was a warrior of the Maratha Empire. Along with Santaji Ghorpade he made terrifying campaigns against Mughal Army from 1689 to 1696. After Santaji, Dhanaji became the chief of the Maratha army in 1696 and remained on the post until his death in 1708.

Background 
Dhanaji was born in or around 1650, to the warrior Maratha family from Sindkhed to Santaji Jadhav. Dhanaji was brought up by Shivaji's mother Jijabai after assassination of Dhanaji's grandfather Achloji, who was Jijabai's brother. Santaji's son Shambhu (Sambhaji) also was brought up by Jijabai, and her son Shivaji after Santaji's martyrdom at the Battle of Pavan Khind with Baji Prabhu Deshpande

Early career 
At an early age, Dhanaji joined Maratha army under Shivaji's Military Chief Prataprao Gujar. 
In the battles at Umbrani and Nesari, Dhanaji's performance attracted attention of Shivaji for the first time. He was named by Shivaji on his death bed among six pillars of Maratha Empire who would save the kingdom in hard times. Their struggle and continued fight against Mughal Army ensured the survival & success of Maratha's in the 27 Years War between Mughal forces of Aurangzeb and the Maratha forces.

A drama 'Bhangale Swapn Maharashtra' written by Bashir Momin Kavathekar portrays the thrill and adventures raid by Santaji & Dhanaji on the Aurangzeb's Camp at Tulapur and also brings out how stringently the guidlines laid down by Shivaji Maharaj were being followed by maratha soldiers (which spared Aurngajeb's life because he was offering religious prayers).

Later career and death
In November 1703, Aurangzeb opened talks with Dhanaji through his son Kambaksh to handover Shahu to him. The talks, however, could not succeed due to the so-called extravagant demands by Dhanaji made on behalf of the Maratha king. In 1705, Maratha army containing about 40,000 soldiers headed by Dhanaji smashed into Surat and looted entire region of Gujarat up to Bharuch. Dhanaji also vanquished the Mughal army under Nazar Ali, the Nawab of Baroda, at Ratanpur and brought huge treasure to Maharashtra.

In 1708, with mediation by his assistant Balaji Vishwanath, who would later become Peshwa in 1713, Dhanaji left Tarabai and joined hands with Shahu at Khed. Soon thereafter he died, because of leg injury, in Vadgaon (Kolhapur). Subsequently, his son Chandrasen Jadhavrao was placed on his post.

Books
“Bhangale Swapna Maharashtra" - Drama written by Bashir Momin Kavathekar

References 

People of the Maratha Empire
Indian military leaders
1650 births
1708 deaths